Karo Aviacijos Tiekimo Skyrius was the Army Aviation Workshops of Lithuania, established at Kaunas. The facility was considerably modernized under the leadership of Antanas Gustaitis, who also designed a variety of aircraft to be built there in small series in the 1920s and 1930s under the designation ANBO.

Aircraft
 ANBO I
 ANBO II
 ANBO III
 ANBO IV
 ANBO V
 ANBO VI
 ANBO VIII

Sources

References 

Aircraft manufacturers of Lithuania
Military history of Lithuania
Defunct manufacturing companies of Lithuania